Päivärinta is a Finnish surname. Notable people with the surname include:

 Pietari Päivärinta (1827–1913), Finnish writer and politician
 Pekka Päivärinta (born 1949), Finnish long-distance runner
 Lassi Päivärinta (born 1954), Finnish mathematician
 Susie Päivärinta (born 1964), Swedish singer and artist
 Lili Päivärinta (born 1966), Swedish singer and artist
 Pekka Päivärinta (born 1971), Finnish motorcycle racer

Finnish-language surnames